Berezina is a rural locality (a village) and the administrative center of Berezinskoye Rural Settlement, Unechsky District, Bryansk Oblast, Russia. The population was 476 as of 2010. There are 5 streets.

Geography 
Berezina is located 15 km southeast of Unecha (the district's administrative centre) by road. Chernyatka is the nearest rural locality.

References 

Rural localities in Unechsky District